= Angus W. Thomson =

British/American immunologist

Angus W. Thomson is a British/American immunologist currently Distinguished Professor of Surgery at Starzl Institute, University of Pittsburgh.

== Education ==
He earned his BSc, PhD and Doctor of Science (DSc) at The University of Aberdeen, his MSc in Immunology at The University of Birmingham and a second DSc at Birmingham.

== Research ==
His interests are dendritic cell immunology, cell transplantation, liver research, and immunity. His highest cited paper is "Tolerogenic dendritic cells and the quest for transplant tolerance" at 780 times, according to Google Scholar.

== Publications ==
- Zahorchak, Alan F.; Macedo, Camila; Hamm, David E.; Butterfield, Lisa H.; Metes, Diana M.; Thomson, Angus W. (January 2018). "High PD-L1/CD86 MFI ratio and IL-10 secretion characterize human regulatory dendritic cells generated for clinical testing in organ transplantation". Cellular Immunology. 323: 9–18. doi:10.1016/j.cellimm.2017.08.008. PMC 5835175. PMID 29217299.
- Thomson, Angus W.; Humar, Abhinav; Lakkis, Fadi G.; Metes, Diana M. (May 2018). "Regulatory dendritic cells for promotion of liver transplant operational tolerance: Rationale for a clinical trial and accompanying mechanistic studies". Human Immunology. 79 (5): 314–321. doi:10.1016/j.humimm.2017.10.017. PMC 5924712. PMID 29100944.
- Ono, Yoshihiro; Perez-Gutierrez, Angelica; Nakao, Toshimasa; Dai, Helong; Camirand, Geoffrey; Yoshida, Osamu; Yokota, Shinichiro; Stolz, Donna Beer; Ross, Mark A.; Morelli, Adrian E.; Geller, David A.; Thomson, Angus W. (April 2018). "Graft-infiltrating PD-L1^{hi} cross-dressed dendritic cells regulate antidonor T cell responses in mouse liver transplant tolerance". Hepatology. 67 (4): 1499–1515. doi:10.1002/hep.29529. PMC 5856603. PMID 28921638.
- Fantus, Daniel; Dai, Helong; Ono, Yoshihiro; Watson, Alicia; Yokota, Shinichiro; Mohib, Kanishka; Yoshida, Osamu; Ross, Mark A.; Watkins, Simon C.; Ramaswami, Bala; Valusjkikh, Anna; Rothstein, David M.; Thomson, Angus W. (December 2017). "Influence of the Novel ATP-Competitive Dual mTORC1/2 Inhibitor AZD2014 on Immune Cell Populations and Heart Allograft Rejection". Transplantation. 101 (12): 2830–2840. doi:10.1097/TP.0000000000001933. PMC 5709200. PMID 28885497.
